This is a list of local government areas (LGA) of New South Wales in Australia.

, there are 128 local government areas in New South Wales.

See also

 Local government areas of New South Wales
 List of former local government areas in New South Wales

References

New South Wales
New South Wales-related lists